The William B. Troubh Ice Arena (formerly the Portland Ice Arena) is an ice hockey arena in Portland, Maine, USA. Located on Park Avenue between Fitzpatrick Stadium and Hadlock Field, the Ice Arena has a seating capacity of 750 and is open year around. Since its opening in 1984, it has been home to Portland Pirates hockey practices as well as local amateur teams and open skating hours. The facility was funded by a 20-year bond which was repaid in 2004. During the summer of 2012, the facility closed for energy efficiency repairs, which were the first major upgrades since the building opened in 1984. The repairs were funded by a $625,000 bond passed by voters in 2011 and were estimated to save the city 67,000 kilowatt-hours in energy use yearly. On January 1, 2015 the Portland Ice Arena changed its name officially to the William B. Troubh Ice Arena as a dedication to William B. Troubh.

References 

Indoor ice hockey venues in Maine
Sports venues in Portland, Maine
Sports venues completed in 1984
1984 establishments in Maine
Ice hockey in Portland, Maine